Robert Andrei Glință (born 18 April 1997) is the Romanian record holder in the long course and short course 50 metre backstroke and 100 metre backstroke. He is a former junior world record holder for 100 metre backstroke (short course), with a time of 50.77 seconds. He finalled in the 100 metre backstroke at two consecutive Summer Olympic Games, the 2016 Summer Olympic Games and the 2020 Summer Olympic Games. He represented Team Iron in the International Swimming League in 2019.

At the 2021 World Short Course Championships, held at in December Etihad Arena in Abu Dhabi, United Arab Emirates, Glință achieved his highest place finish in the 100 metre backstroke, where he won the bronze medal with a time of 49.60 seconds, which was 0.37 seconds behind gold medalist Shaine Casas of the United States. It marked his first medal at a senior short course or long course World Championships. For the edition of the World Short Course Championships the following year, the 2022 World Short Course Championships held in December in Melbourne, Australia, he placed twenty-eighth in the 100 metre backstroke with a time of 52.65 seconds.

International championships (50 m)

International championships (25 m)

Personal bests

Long course metres (50 m pool)

Short course metres (25 m pool)

References

External links

USC Trojans bio

Romanian male freestyle swimmers
1997 births
Swimmers at the 2014 Summer Youth Olympics
Living people
Swimmers at the 2015 European Games
Swimmers at the 2016 Summer Olympics
Swimmers at the 2020 Summer Olympics
Olympic swimmers of Romania
Romanian male backstroke swimmers
USC Trojans men's swimmers
European Aquatics Championships medalists in swimming
Romanian expatriate sportspeople in the United States
Sportspeople from Pitești
European Games competitors for Romania
Medalists at the FINA World Swimming Championships (25 m)
20th-century Romanian people
21st-century Romanian people